Anita is a 1967 Indian suspense film, directed and written by Raj Khosla, and starring Manoj Kumar and Sadhana. The film is the last of the suspense-thriller trilogy of Khosla-Sadhana partnership. Woh Kaun Thi? (1964) and Mera Saaya (1966) were the two previous films in the series. The movie flopped at the box office. The plot twist of the movie was based on that of the 1958 film Vertigo.

Plot
Neeraj (Manoj Kumar) and Anita (Sadhana) are deeply in love and wants to marry but is unacceptable to her father Mr. Bihari Lal, a millionaire as Neeraj do an ordinary job and Anita is a millionaire. When her father rejects her marriage with Neeraj, Anita visits Neeraj and asks him to marry her by Civil Marriage. When both reach court, her father comes and tells her not to sign otherwise the consequences will be bad. She comes home with her father. Anita's father wants her to marry Anil Sharma (Kishen Mehta), a business tycoon. When Neeraj tries to talk with her, she tells him to not come back in her life. Initially, Anita wants Neeraj to walk out of her life but later, Neeraj gets a letter from Anita, which raises some suspicions in his mind. He goes to meet her, only to learn that she has committed suicide. Neeraj suspects foul play and decides to find out the truth on his own.

He sees Anita at the same exact place where she supposedly committed suicide. His friend advises Neeraj to go on a vacation and try to forget the incident. During his vacation, at a picnic, Neeraj once again sees Anita as a saffron clad sadhvi (saint), Maya. Neeraj learns that he saw Maya Jogan(also played by Sadhana), who died 20 years ago. He sees her again in a train coach while travelling to Mumbai.

Anita sends a letter to Neeraj asking him to meet at a hotel so that she can disclose the truth. To avoid the police, Anita meets Neeraj in his house. Anita then takes Neeraj to the secret building where Anil reveals that he killed his lover who was pregnant and threw her into the river and made it look like Anita committed suicide. Later the police come chasing Anil and he is killed in an encounter. After that, Neeraj and Anita are reunited and hug each other.

Cast
 Manoj Kumar as Neeraj
 Sadhana as Anita/Maya
 Sajjan (actor) as Anita's father
 Ulhas as Maharaj, astrologer
 Kishan Mehta as Anil Sharma
 Chand Usmani as Varsha
 Shah Agha as Varsha's husband
 Dhumal as Razdhan detective
 Mukri as Joseph Baker
 Tun Tun (Uma Devi Khatri) as Mrs. Joseph Baker
 Shivraj as Police Commissioner
 Birbal (Who was Satyendra Khosla - got screen name as Birbal in this movie) as Roshandan, assistant to Dhumal
 I. S. Johar as painter
 Bela Bose as dancer in La Bella
 Madhumati as blonde dancer in La Bella
 Meena T as typist in Razdhan's office
 Kedarnath Saigal as Peter

Music
Composed by the musical duo Laxmikant Pyarelal, the songs of the film are penned by Raja Mehdi Ali Khan, Anand Bakshi and Arzoo Lucknavi. The music album also has two instrumentals, the title music track and the suspense theme track.

Filming
This is probably the only movie where a full song "Gore gore chand se mukh par" is played before the opening credits.

Some of the scenes in the movie were shot in Nainital.

The ashram and temple is Hanuman Garhi in Nainital, where the song "Tum bin jeevan kaise beeta" is shot.

The final scene is shot at Mumbai'S Vihar Lake area. The popular 'Humpty Dumpty' cartoon structures can be seen.

External links
 
 Reference for Birbal's original name |https://www.youtube.com/watch?v=MheN2i1Y0W8&t=1929s

1967 films
1960s Hindi-language films
Films directed by Raj Khosla
Films scored by Laxmikant–Pyarelal